Divorce in Poland occurs at a rate slightly below that of the average for Europe. Divorce requests are assessed by the court, in accordance with the positive and negative prerequisites set in the relevant law.

Law
In order for a divorce to be granted there is a need of the satisfaction of the positive prerequisite (the presence of the ground for divorce) and of the negative prerequisite (the absence of conditions which prohibit the granting of the divorce). Current divorce in Poland is regulated by Polish law divorce is regulated by the statute of February 25, 1964: The Polish Family and Guardianship Code, which came into force on January 1, 1965. The statute is divided into three parts (titles), the first of which concerns matrimonial matters of marriage. The law also updated in 1999 to include legal separation.

Grounds for divorce
There is one single ground of divorce, namely "the irretrievable and complete disintegration of matrimonial life" (Article 56 (1) of the Polish Family and Guardianship Code). Usually, a lack of any spiritual, physical and economic bonds between the spouses is necessary in order to prove the ground of divorce, although the Supreme Court has ruled that part of the economic bond may still remain (for example if the spouses live in the same home, although their matrimonial life is otherwise disintegrated). The existence of the ground for divorce is essential - if it is not proven, then the divorce cannot be granted.

The negative prerequisites
If the ground above is proven, the court assesses ex-officio (of its own motion) whether there are any of the conditions which prohibit the granting of the divorce. If any of them are present, the divorce cannot be granted, even if the ground for divorce has been proven. The negative prerequisites are (Articles 56 (2) and 56 (3) of Polish Family and Guardianship Code):
the divorce would be detrimental to the welfare of the common minor children of the spouses
the divorce would be contrary to the principles of social norms
the divorce is requested by the spouse who is solely guilty for the disintegration of matrimonial life, unless 
the other spouse consents to the divorce, or
the refusal of the other spouse to consent to the divorce is contrary to social norms (e.g. is done only due to revenge)

Fault
The divorce law is fault-based. The court rules ex-officio on who is at fault for the divorce, unless the spouses request otherwise. The court may rule that one spouse is guilty, that both spouses are guilty, or that neither spouse is guilty. Being solely at fault has two ramifications: firstly, the sole guilty party cannot be granted a divorce without the consent of the innocent spouse (unless the innocent spouse withholds consent for reasons contrary to social norms); and secondly, the guilty party can be ordered to pay alimony (Article 57 (1) and 57 (2) of the Polish Family and Guardianship Code).

Length of Divorce Process
Regional courts in Poland usually can take one to two years to complete the divorce process after a divorce petition is filed.

References

Poland
Law of Poland